Farace is a surname. Notable people with the surname include:

Anthony Farace (born 1976), American soccer player
Costabile Farace (1960–1989), American mobster